Mauvais noir is an alternative name to several wine grape varieties including:

Dolcetto
Douce noir
Peloursin